For the Sake of My Intemperate Youth is a 1952 Swedish drama film directed by Arne Mattsson. It was entered into the 1953 Cannes Film Festival.

Cast
 Aino Taube - Greta Arvidsson
 Georg Rydeberg - Karl Arvidsson
 Nils Hallberg - Kuno Andersson
 Ulla-Bella Fridh - Maj (as Ulla-Britt Fridh)
 Ester Roeck-Hansen - Berit Altman
 Erik 'Bullen' Berglund - Altman (as Erik Berglund)
 Ib Schønberg - Madsen (as Ib Schönberg)
 Naima Wifstrand - Vendela Påhlman
 Margareta Fahlén - Elaine
 Ragnvi Lindbladh - Marianne (as Ragnvi Lindblad)
 Wiktor Andersson - School Janitor (as Kulörten Andersson)
 Else Jarlbak - Maid (as Elsie Jarlback)
 Hanny Schedin - Maj's Mother
 Birgitta Olzon - Maj's Schoolmate (as Birgitta Olsson)
 Axel Högel - Train Conductor
 Mats Björne - Jens
 Lars Egge - Dr. Knut Hegel
 Erik Hell - Blind Musician
 Maj-Britt Nilsson - Ingrid 'Ninni' Arvidsson
 Folke Sundquist - Torben Altman

References

External links

1952 films
1950s Swedish-language films
1952 drama films
Swedish black-and-white films
Films directed by Arne Mattsson
Swedish drama films
1950s Swedish films